Three regiments of the British Army have been numbered the 64th Regiment of Foot:

Loudon's Highlanders, raised in 1745 and ranked as 64th Foot
79th Regiment of Foot (1757), 64th Regiment of Foot, raised in 1757 and renumbered as the 79th
64th (2nd Staffordshire) Regiment of Foot, raised in 1758